Lal Chand Kataruchak is an Indian politician and the MLA from Bhoa Assembly constituency. He belongs to vill Kataru Chak in Pathankot. He is a member of the Aam Aadmi Party. He had been sarpanch of Kataru Chak village for six terms.

Member of Legislative Assembly
Kataruchakk was elected as the MLA in the 2022 Punjab Legislative Assembly election.  The Aam Aadmi Party gained a strong 79% majority in the sixteenth Punjab Legislative Assembly by winning 92 out of 117 seats in the 2022 Punjab Legislative Assembly election. MP Bhagwant Mann was sworn in as Chief Minister on 16 March 2022.  Kataruchakk represented the Bhoa Assembly constituency in the Punjab Legislative Assembly. He took oath as a cabinet minister along with nine other MLAs on 19 March at Guru Nanak Dev auditorium of Punjab Raj Bhavan in Chandigarh. Eight ministers including Kataruchakk who took oath were greenhorn (first term) MLAs.

As a cabinet minister in the Mann ministry Kataruchakk was given the charge of two departments of the Punjab Government:
 Department of Food, Civil Supplies & Consumer Affairs
 Department of Forest and Wild Life Preservation

Electoral performance

References

Living people
Punjab, India MLAs 2022–2027
Aam Aadmi Party politicians from Punjab, India
Mann ministry
Year of birth missing (living people)